Operation EF (1941), also the Raid on Kirkenes and Petsamo took place on 30 July 1941, during the Second World War.

The War Cabinet and Admiralty pressed Admiral John "Jack" Tovey, commander of the Home Fleet, to attack, despite his reservations that the prospects for success were not commensurate with the risks. The operation was intended to be a surprise but in the far north, the midnight sun at that time of year made it unlikely that the raiding force would go undiscovered.

A German aircraft passed Force P and the carrier aircraft flew over a ship on their flights to Kirkenes and Petsamo, depriving the attackers of surprise. The Kirkenes force was intercepted by several German fighters as the aircraft attacked the few ships to be seen in the harbour, sinking one ship and setting another on fire. Eleven Fairey Albacores and two Fairey Fulmar fighters were shot down, for a loss of two  aircraft.

The force attacking Petsamo faced less opposition, losing a Fulmar to engine failure on the flight to the target and a Fulmar and an Albacore shot down during the attack. Minor damage was caused to jetties, a shipyard and oil storage tanks. The operation has been called an "unqualified disaster"; twelve Albacores and four Fulmars had been lost with nine men killed and 27 taken prisoner for no appreciable result; two Fulmar crewmen reached Russian territory after two days at sea in a dinghy.

Background

Continuation War

In Directive 21, the instructions from Hitler for Operation Barbarossa, Murmansk was to be isolated by a military operation to cut the  Murmansk–Leningrad railway. The attack was to prevent the Red Army from moving forces from the interior and attacking iron ore mines in northern Sweden and nickel mines around Pechenga, only  from Murmansk; the  base at Kirkenes was only another  further on.  reconnaissance revealed a considerable garrison at Murmansk and excellent rail marshalling yards and port facilities.

On 3 February 1941, the German Army of Norway received its operation order for the coming campaign, making the defence of northern Norway its priority.  (Mountain Corps Norway) was to operate in Finland in defence of Pechenga in Operation Rentier until Finland declared war. The Finns were to cover the deployment of German troops in central Finland and to recapture Hanko, then operate to the south-west, either side of Lake Ladoga, when Army Group North had reached the Dvina River, meeting the German forces at Tikhvin. The German invasion of the Soviet Union began on 22 June 1941 and the German offensive against the Murmansk railway Operation Platinum Fox (29 June – 21 September) began, part of the larger Operation Silver Fox (29 June – 17 November).

Prelude

Naval operations

The German submarines U-81 and U-652 began operations off the Kola Inlet in July and five destroyers transferred to Kirkenes to join the training ship Bremse and other vessels. Before the German invasion of the Soviet Union, the Home Fleet was mainly concerned with the exits of the North Sea from Norway to Greenland. After 22 June 1941, the emphasis of the Home Fleet began to shift northwards, from Norway to the Arctic. The Soviet leadership pressed the British to attack Axis sea traffic from Petsamo and Kirkenes. The governments in London and Washington were aware of the importance of Murmansk as a entrepôt for Allied war material. Tovey stressed the risk in operating carriers so close to  airfields, in conditions of the midnight sun, which in northern Norway lasts from about 14 May to 29 July. The Admiralty over-ruled Tovey and ordered him to conduct Operation EF with Force P.

Force P

Furious embarked Fairey Fulmar fighters of 800 Naval Air Squadron (800 NAS) and four Sea Hurricanes (A Flight) nine Swordfish of 812 NAS and nine Fairey Albacores of 817 NAS. Victorious had the Albacores of 827 and 828 NAS and the Fulmars of 809 NAS. The force reached   (Seidisfjord) in Iceland on 25 July, refuelled and sailed the following day for Norway.

The aircrew on Victorious were briefed to attack Kirkenes and those on Furious to raid Petsamo. Should the harbours be empty, the force from Victorious would attack an iron ore plant and those from Furious some oil storage tanks. Just before the aircraft began to take off, a He 111 aircraft was seen, foiling the attempt at surprise. The three Albacore and one Swordfish squadron took off first and the Fulmars followed after twenty minutes, the Sea Hurricanes remaining to guard the ships.

Attack

Kirkenes

Victorious sent two sub-flights, consisting of twelve Albacores from 827 NAS, eight from 828 NAS and nine Fulmars from 809 NAS. The crews of 827 NAS were to attack ships around the Tower of Kirkenes and Langfjord as the eight from 828 NAS concentrated on Holmengraafjord and an anchorage east of Renoy Island. The aircraft flew towards the sun at low altitude to evade radar but passed over a German hospital ship, losing any remaining hope of surprise. The crews fired the  colours-of-the-day as a ruse but this failed and the ground fire increased and then suddenly stopped. Thirteen Messerschmitt Bf 109 and Bf 110 fighters appeared, escorting nine Ju 87 dive-bombers from a raid.

The shipping in the harbour turned out to be a  training ship and two medium-sized freighters, which were attacked, bomb hits on the two merchantmen being claimed after the raid. The Fulmar escorts tried to divert the German fighters from the Albacores and shot down a Bf 110 for the loss of two Fulmars. The Albacores released their torpedoes quickly to get away from anti-aircraft fire, sinking one  vessel, setting another on fire and causing minor damage ashore. The Albacores tried to escape the German fighters, having the advantage of superior manoeuvrability but eleven were picked off. An 827 Squadron pilot claimed a Ju 87 which flew in front of his Albacore, which was borne out later by German records. Incomplete German loss records confirm the loss of at least one Bf 110 to a Fulmar and one Ju 87 to an Albacore.

Petsamo
Furious sent nine Swordfish of 812 NAS and nine Albacores of 817 NAS to raid Petsamo. A Fulmar was lost due to engine failure prior to the attack and the remainder found a harbour almost deserted, except for anti-aircraft guns. The aircraft dropped their torpedoes against a small ship and the jetties but these were wooden and easy to replace. The 800 NAS Fulmar bombers attacked a shipyard and the oil storage tanks but had little effect. The attackers were intercepted by Bf 109 fighters; an Albacore and a Fulmar were shot down.

Aftermath

Analysis

By the early evening, the surviving aircraft had landed on their carriers and Force P had begun the voyage back to Scapa Flow. On 31 July a Dornier Do 18 began to shadow the force until two of the Sea Hurricanes shot it down. The commander of Furious called the raid

In 2005, Ron Mackay called the raid an "unqualified disaster"; twelve Albacores and four Fulmars had been lost with nine men killed and 27 taken prisoner. The vulnerability of the Albacore and Fulmar aircraft against modern fighters had been demonstrated but the Swordfish of 812 NAS had escaped loss, perhaps because the raid on Petsamo had encountered less opposition than that on Kirkenes. Mackay wrote that it would have been better to send the Sea Hurricanes to cover the raid, despite hindsight suggesting that four Sea Hurricanes were hardly adequate to defend the ships.

Casualties

In 2005, Ron Mackay wrote that twelve Albacores and four Fulmars had been lost with nine men killed, 27 taken prisoner and two men rescued by Soviet forces after two days at sea in a dinghy. In 2012, Ben Jones wrote that 16 aircraft were lost in the raids and in 2014, Martyn Chorlton wrote that Victorious lost 13 Albacores and their crews in the raid.

Subsequent operations

The Albacore squadrons were transferred from Victorious during August and replaced by 817 and 832 NAS. Victorious became part of Force M, operating towards Bear Island and the approaches to the White Sea, during Operation Dervish. On 3 September, an attack on ships sailing from Tromsø to Kirkenes began but when cloud cover dissipated, the formation leaders aborted the attack according to their instructions, because of the risk of interception by the  fighters based at Banak. Force M remained off the Norwegian coast and on 12 September an attack was made on ships and shore installations at Bodø, one ship being sunk and an aluminium factory at Glomfjord being damaged.

The lack of fighter opposition led to a second raid being planned but this was cancelled when the force was spotted by a He 111. Two Blohm & Voss BV 138 flying boats began to shadow the force and the FAA Fulmars found it impossible to penetrate their armour with .303 Browning machine-gun fire. A raid on 9 October was hampered by heavy seas and five of the 13 Albacores on deck were damaged; three Albacores managed to find and attack a freighter. During the afternoon, eight composite crews from 817 and 832 NAS attacked two merchantmen which were escorted by flak ships and achieved several bomb hits, one ship crew taking to their lifeboats.

Notes

Footnotes

References

 
 
 
 
 
 
 
 

Journals

Further reading

External links
 Tovey, ''The Carrier borne Aircraft Attack on Kirkenes AND Petsamo
 FAA attack on Petsamo to assist its ally the Soviet Union, July 1941 Fleet Air Arm Archive 1939–1945
 Don Kindell, British and Other Navies in World War 2 Day-by-Day: Naval Events, July 1941 (Part 2)
 Commonwealth War Graves Commission

Soviet Union–United Kingdom relations
Arctic military operations of World War II
Aerial operations and battles of World War II involving the United Kingdom
Aerial operations and battles of World War II involving Germany
1941 in Finland
History of the Arctic
Conflicts in 1941
Battles and operations of the Continuation War
History of Finnmark
Sør-Varanger
1941 in Norway
World War II raids
Naval aviation operations and battles
July 1941 events